The 2011 season for  began in January with the Tour Down Under, where defending champion André Greipel debuted for the team, and ended in October at the Giro di Lombardia. As a UCI ProTeam, they were automatically invited and obligated to send a squad to every event in the UCI World Tour. The team's roster changed drastically from 2010.

But the caliber of the bulk of those victories set team Omega Pharma-Lotto apart. Team leader Philippe Gilbert won four races in ten days in April, including all three Ardennes classics, as well as five other races that counted toward the UCI World Tour rankings (and a further nine that did not), marking this as a truly dominant year for the Belgian. He handily won the individual World Tour crown, with his points total more than that of over half the teams in the standings. Thanks mostly to Gilbert, Omega Pharma-Lotto also won the World Tour team award. Greipel also proved a reasonably prolific winner, winning eight races on the season, three of which counted toward the World Tour rankings.

The other major story for the team in 2011 was the rift of its two title sponsors. Omega Pharma, through their various product names, and the Belgian national lottery had sponsored the team since 2005, but it was announced relatively early in the 2011 season that they would not remain together after 2011, having different visions for the continuation of the team.

2011 roster
Ages as of January 1, 2011.

Riders who joined the team for the 2011 season

Riders who left the team during or after the 2010 season

One-day races

Spring classics
In March, Gilbert won Montepaschi Strade Bianche by performing a very late-race attack, a tactic that has earned him most of his professional victories. While Gilbert's attacks, when successful, usually get him away alone, this time he had to deal with Alessandro Ballan and Damiano Cunego, who were able to follow. The three decided the race a few bike lengths ahead of the rest of the 20-strong leading group, with Gilbert coming across the line ahead of Ballan and then Cunego. At the first monument race of the season, Milan – San Remo, Gilbert was considered a strong favorite victory, largely due to his win on the Strade Bianche. Greipel also rode, as the team's "Plan B" for victory, but after his injurious crash in the Tirreno–Adriatico, he was not thought to be on the best form. Roelandts and Greipel both took pulls on the front of the leading group, indicating that Greipel was not on sufficient form to ride for the win himself. Little by little, the leading group that had once been 44 dwindled to only eight, a select group that formed on the Poggio just a few kilometers from the finish. Gilbert tried twice to attack and solo his way to victory, once on the Poggio and once again on the finishing straight in San Remo, but he was chased down by Filippo Pozzato. While he had a gap for a brief moment in the final few meters in San Remo, both Fabian Cancellara and race winner Matthew Goss were able to pass him, leaving Gilbert third. After the race, Gilbert criticized Pozzato for chasing him down, and said that with Goss in the leading group it would have been nearly impossible for him to win.

In April, Gilbert had one of the most dominant two-week periods any rider ever has. First, he took the win at Brabantse Pijl, a race seen as a precursor to the Ardennes classics. He and compatriot Björn Leukemans attacked out of what had been a leading group of ten, and stayed clear to the finish where Gilbert won the sprint. Next was the Amstel Gold Race, the first of the Ardennes classics. Gilbert came in as the defending champion, and a strong favorite. He rode a tactically sound race, staying at the front through the many selections over the 31 recognized climbs in the race. After Andy Schleck launched an attack for victory on the Keutenberg,  from the finish, Gilbert and 's Joaquim Rodríguez were among the group that overtook him on the Cauberg, the final climb. Gilbert's final finishing kick got him clear of Rodríguez by two seconds, earning him the race win for the second year in a row. 's Simon Gerrans was third. One post-race analysis opined that Gilbert's race demonstrated that he is the best rider in the world on a short uphill finish. Gilbert was the first rider since Rolf Järmann in 1998 to be a repeat winner of the Amstel, and the first since Jan Raas in 1980 to win consecutive editions. The second Ardennes classic was La Flèche Wallonne. Gilbert was mentioned among the contenders, but the Mur de Huy climb at the finish being steeper than anything covered by the Amstel, pre-race analysis viewed Rodríguez, Alberto Contador, and Robert Gesink, among others, as bigger favorites.  and  did the bulk of the work in the peloton chasing down the morning escape, which took an advantage that ballooned to 17 minutes at one point. Gilbert later explained that Omega Pharma-Lotto did not contribute much work because their domestiques were spent from work done at Brabantse Pijl and Amstel Gold, and that La Flèche Wallonne, while still a goal for Gilbert, was not as important to him as Liège–Bastogne–Liège. The early escape was indeed caught, and a flurry of attacks and counter-attacks followed. For a while, a group of ten riders held a sustained advantage of less than a minute over the main field. Omega Pharma-Lotto was forced to work at this point, since they had no rider in that leading group. The last breakaway group was of two riders, and while they had a 14-second gap over the rest of the field going into the final kilometer, the third and final ascent of the Mur de Huy made sure that the pre-race favorites figured into the finale. Michael Albasini and Christophe Le Mével tried to solo up the Mur to victory, but they effectively led out Rodríguez and Gilbert. Gilbert again surged past Rodríguez for victory, with Samuel Sánchez rounding out the podium this time.

Liège–Bastogne–Liège was always Gilbert's biggest goal of the spring season, and victories in the first two Ardennes classics, as well as the Brabantse Pijl to precede them, left Gilbert even more anxious for victory. Liège–Bastogne–Liège, nicknamed La Doyenne (French for "the oldest", as it is the oldest continuously run cycling event in the world), is also the fourth monument race of the season. Gilbert was the clear favorite for the race – one analyst referred to it as the "Omega Pharma-Lotto rider versus the peloton." On race day, a group of 13 riders distinguished themselves as the leaders on the road for much of the day. Omega Pharma-Lotto was forced to do most of the work in the main field. Between the Col du Maquisard and the Côte de la Redoute, where the race has often been decided in the past, they stopped pulling at the front of the peloton. The time gap to the leaders briefly increased, before  and Gilbert's former team  sent men to the front. On the next climb, the Côte de Roche aux Faucons, the widely expected attack from 's two leaders, the Schleck brothers, took place. Gilbert marked them, and effectively stayed in their slipstreams as the trio surged to the front of the race, past the remnants of the morning breakaway. Later, Gilbert himself took pulls. Andy Schleck took more pulls than his brother Fränk as the race wore on. At one point, on the Côte de Saint-Nicolas, Gilbert slipped away with only the elder Schleck able to follow. Andy later bridged back. At the finish, which took place on a slight downhill, neither Luxembourger put in any sort of challenge to Gilbert, and his superior sprint got him to the line first ahead of Fränk Schleck in second by a few bike lengths. The win made Gilbert just the second rider in history to win all three Ardennes classics in the same year, after Davide Rebellin in 2004. Factoring in the Brabantse Pijl made him the first rider ever to win all four of those races, which took place over a span of only 11 days, in the same year.

Gilbert's great successes in the Ardennes bore out in the UCI rankings. While the Brabantse Pijl did not contribute points toward the rankings, the other three races did. Gilbert had been 16th prior to the Amstel Gold Race, but took over fifth with his win there. His points also helped his home nation of Belgium take the lead in that classification, and the Omega Pharma-Lotto team moved up four slots as well. Rankings were not published after La Flèche Wallonne, but after Liège–Bastogne–Liège, Gilbert had moved up to world number one, by 120 points over Fabian Cancellara, with Belgium further increasing their lead in the nations classification. Omega Pharma-Lotto moved up another five places, to third.

The team also sent squads to the Trofeo Inca, Trofeo Deià, the Clásica de Almería, Le Samyn, Nokere Koerse, the Handzame Classic, Dwars door Vlaanderen, the Scheldeprijs, Paris–Roubaix, the Eschborn–Frankfurt City Loop, ProRace Berlin, Ruddervoorde Koerse and Halle–Ingooigem, but placed no higher than 13th in any of these races.

Fall races
The team also sent squads to the Grand Prix José Dubois, the GP Ouest-France, Paris–Brussels, the Grand Prix d'Isbergues, Binche–Tournai–Binche, Paris–Tours, the Nationale Sluitingsprijs, and the Giro del Piemonte, but finished no higher than 13th in any of these races.

Stage races
The team hoped for more of the same from Greipel in 2011, though he did not win any stage, finishing second twice, and was only seventh overall. Thus, he felt pressure to perform at his next event, the Volta ao Algarve. Gilbert was also named to the squad for this event, to try to win stages that may be too selective for Greipel. As it turned out, both riders indeed took wins in the Portuguese tour. Gilbert won the first stage with his signature late race attack. He finished five seconds clear of the peloton, led home by Gerald Ciolek and then Greipel. Gilbert later stated that his attack was the team's plan all along, and they did not want this stage, though flat, to end in a field sprint. Three stages later, Greipel won a traditional mass sprint. At Tirreno–Adriatico in March, Gilbert won a stage in a manner somewhat different from his usual style. He and three other attackers coming clear of the second group on the road bridged up to the two leaders, who had been out front all day. Gilbert rode against the guardrails while Poels took to the middle of the road, and claimed victory just ahead of the Dutchman. Greipel won the flat first stage of the Three Days of De Panne, but he did so by foiling a field sprint. He joined a counter-attack just as the day's morning escape was caught and easily bested his three breakaway mates at the finish line, though the peloton had come so close to catching them there was no appreciable time gap at the finish. In April, Blythe won the youth classification of the two-day Ronde van Drenthe. Both stages had sprint finishes, though the second was much more selective than the first, with only 11 riders tied on the same time. Blythe finished at the front of the race both days, and had better combined stage finishes than Jetse Bol and Barry Markus from the Rabobank continental team, winning him the award. Greipel got another stage win from a breakaway at the Presidential Cycling Tour of Turkey. He joined 11 others in the morning breakaway on stage 6. They were joined midway through the stage by 15 other riders, including three who had made a breakaway that won 12 minutes the previous day and were therefore very invested in keeping this break stay away. Greipel was easily the strongest sprinter in the group, and took a comfortable victory. At the Tour de Picardie, Dehaes won the points jersey and finished second overall behind 's Romain Feillu.

The team also won lesser classifications at the Vuelta a Andalucía, the Tour of Belgium, and the Ster ZLM Toer. The team also sent squads to the Tour Down Under, Driedaagse van West-Vlaanderen, Paris–Nice, Volta a Catalunya, the Tour of the Basque Country, the Tour de Romandie, the Tour de Suisse, the Tour de Wallonie, the Tour de Pologne, the Tour de Wallonie-Picarde, the Tour of Beijing and the Herald Sun Tour, but did not achieve a stage win, classification win, or podium finish in any of them.

Grand Tours

Giro d'Italia

Tour de France

Vuelta a España

Season victories

Away from competition

Split of sponsors

Footnotes

References

2011 road cycling season by team
Lotto–Soudal
2011 in Belgian sport